Abdisalaam Issa Khatib is a Member of Parliament in the National Assembly of Tanzania.

References

External links
 Parliament of Tanzania website

Living people
Year of birth missing (living people)
Members of the National Assembly (Tanzania)